The Kaicene F30 (凯程 神骐F30) is a compact pickup truck which was developed by Changan Automobile under the sub brand Kaicene since January 2016.

Overview 
The Kaicene F30 is the first product of Kaicene's Shenqi series pickup trucks.  The F30 is categorized as a compact pickup truck available as standard and long wheelbase models. The long wheelbase model is 55mm longer and 30 mm narrower than the standard wheelbase model, and only the standard wheelbase model is equipped with fog lamps. The standard wheelbase model has a cargo bed with dimensions: 1500×1415×480mm while the long wheelbase model has a cargo bed with dimensions: 2020×1465×400mm. The crew cab models were the first to launch in 2016 while the single cab model was launched later in July 2018. The single cab model features a dropside bed with dimensions: 3000×1580×400mm.

Powertrain 
The full model range of the F30 is powered by a 1.5-litre Mitsubishi gasoline engine with a maximum output of 112hp and 142N·m supplied by Dongan mated to a 5-speed manual transmission.

Kaicene F50 
The Kaicene F50 is a mid-size pickup truck based on the same platform and body work as the F30 while being slightly larger than the F30. The Kaicene F50 features a redesigned front end to differentiate from the F30. The standard wheelbase model has a cargo bed with dimensions: 1380×1465×480mm while the long wheelbase model has a cargo bed with dimensions: 1740×1465×480mm. The Kaicene F50 is discontinued as of 2020.

Powertrain 
The full model range of the F50 is powered by a 2.2-litre gasoline engine codenamed 491QE with a maximum output of 106hp mated to a 5-speed manual transmission.

References

2010s cars
Cars introduced in 2016
Pickup trucks
All-wheel-drive vehicles
Cars of China